Hasan Mashhud Chowdhury (born 9 September 1948) was a Bangladesh Army general who was 11th Chief of Army Staff of the Bangladesh Army from 16 June 2002 to 15 June 2005. He was the last officer to serve in this position who had first been commissioned by and served with the Pakistani Army, before the Liberation War of 1971. He served for two years before the war.

After Chowdhury retired from his career with the Bangladesh Army, in October 2006 he was appointed as an adviser of the interim caretaker government. Chowdhury and three other advisers, Akbar Ali Khan, C M Shafi Sami and Sultana Kamal, resigned in December .

In 2007, Chowdhury was appointed as chairman of the Anti-Corruption Commission. He served nearly two years until April 2009 and resigned during Sheikh Hasina's government period.

Early life and education
Hasan Mashhud Chowdhury spent his childhood in Sylhet. His student life started in a patshala in Kanishail Village of Sylhet. As his father had work that reassigned him to different locations, Chowdhury moved with his father and family to Barisal. He studied at Barisal Zilla School for five years.

After passing SSC from Sylhet Government Pilot High School in 1964, he was admitted to Notre Dame College, Dhaka and moved to Dhaka. In 1966 he transferred to the Economics Department of the University of Dhaka. One year later Chowdhury decided to join the army.

Military life in the Pakistan Army
The Pakistani Army sent Chowdhury to the Pakistan Military Academy at Kakul in West Pakistan. On 20 April 1969, he was commissioned into the Frontier Force Regiment. He worked in Karachi, Lahore, Azad Kashmir and Sindh. He went to Quetta a few times for training.

During the Bangladesh Liberation War of 1971, Chowdhury was interned by the West Pakistanis as an enemy officer because of his birth and rearing in Eastern Pakistan. He recalled later, "I was interned in a remote place surrounded by mountains. We were treated as prisoners of war. It was clear to me that we would be used to exchange for West Pakistani prisoners of war in India." He was held in West Pakistan from 1972 to 1974 and described the period as "miserable and wastage of time and working ability."

Bangladesh Army career
In January 1974, Chowdhury was finally released and returned to Independent Bangladesh, where he joined the Bangladesh Army. He joined the 17th East Bengal Regiment as a company commander. In 1975 he became the brigade major (BM) of the 46th Brigade headquartered at Dhaka. Later he returned to 17th East Bengal Regiment as the acting commanding officer. After this, he was appointed as the GSO-1 in the 9th Division. In 1979, he went to the Mirpur Staff College for staff course and after this he was appointed as the directing staff there. After that in 1981, he was assigned to Alikadam of Chittagong Hill Tracts as the C.O. of 17th East Bengal. From there in '82's July, he went to Bangladesh Military Academy as the GSO -1 (Training) at Bhatiari and after this he was appointed as the C.O. of 35 E. Bengal in 1984's August.

In 1986's January, he was appointed as the acting brigade commander at Savar (81 Infantry Brigade). After this, he was appointed as the director of Special Security Force which was then known as President's Security Force, after that he was appointed as the 44th Brigade commander and later in '89's May the commandant of School of Infantry and Tactics. At the time of the Gulf War in 1990, he commanded a Bangladesh Military contingent that took part in the war. He and his forces were stationed for nine months in different places across Saudi Arabia. He described his experience as "tough but professionally pleasing."

In June 1991, after returning from the Gulf war, Chowdhury was elected for training at the United States Army War College (USAWC). At the same time he earned a Master of Public Administration degree at Shippensburg University of Pennsylvania. He graduated from USAWC in 1992. As part of the training, he toured other military forces in Argentina, Brazil, Ecuador and Mexico.

Upon his return, he was appointed as a Brigade Commander at Khagrachhari (203 Brigade), Chittagong Hill Tracts. After that he was posted at Defence Services Command and Staff College at Mirpur as it's commandant. In 23 June 1996, he became Area Commander, Bogra Area and General Officer Commanding of the 11th Infantry Division after a turmoil inside the army in 1996.

After one year, he was appointed as Chief of General Staff and then as Commandant of the National Defence College from 1 March 2000 to 31 December 2000. Passed over when M Harun-Ar-Rashid was made Chief of Army Staff on 25 December 2002, Chowdhury chose to serve as an envoy and was appointed Ambassador to the United Arab Emirates, where he helped Bangladeshi immigrants.

On 16 June 2002, he was promoted from Major General to Lieutenant General and appointed Chief of Army Staff, the highest position for an army officer. After serving three years, Chowdhury was asked to extend his term, but he refused. He said, "... three years was sufficient to prove the credibility of an army chief. Secondly those who are new were ready and interested for this responsibility.

Adviser of the caretaker government
At the start of October 2006, as the confusion about Chief Justice K.M. Hasan started, he expressed his inability. Though he finally agreed to take the duty after the situation had changed.
Then Bangladesh Jamaat-e-Islami proposed his name to become an adviser to the interim Caretaker Government. The Awami League (AL) nominated Sultana Kamal and Sheikh Hasina was consulted on C. M. Shafi Sami by Mukhlesur Rahman Chowdhury, as part of the AL quota.

Working with the other advisers, Chowdhury was concerned by what he perceived as lack of leadership and unwillingness to take the right decision at the right time. When the package proposal of the advisers was accepted by the opposite political parties, he was surprised to see the ignorance of the chief adviser and the President Iajuddin Ahmed about it.

When Chowdhury learned of its deployment, he and three other advisers immediately resigned, including Akbar Ali Khan, CM Shafi Sami and Sultana Kamal. Responding to a question about his position, Chowdhury said that he believed the regular agencies of the government were sufficient to maintain law and order. He felt the Army could be used for special needs, but not too early in an election cycle. Chowdhury did not assume all responsibility for the political crisis, saying other parties also contributed to it.

As chairman of Anti-Corruption Commission 
On 22 February 2007, Chowdhury was appointed as chairman of the Anti-Corruption Commission. He said he would undertake a sustained battle against corruption, and numerous people were prosecuted for graft.

Chowdhury had to resign on 2 April 2009 after the Awami League ascended to rule. Without his knowledge, the Moeen group had filed cases at night; they arrested former prime ministers and leaders of the two major parties, Khaleda Zia and Sheikh Hasina, of the BNP and Awami League, respectively. Awami League MP's, led by Mohiuddin Khan Alamgir, strongly criticised Mashhud in the parliament for appointing majority of the directors of the commission from the armed forces, and he resigned. Bangladesh Nationalist Party MPs, led by Moudud Ahmed, supported the Awami position.

Marriage and family
After 3 years of serving with the Bangladesh Army, he married 'Zarnigar' in 1977.

Honours

References

1948 births
Living people
Shippensburg University of Pennsylvania alumni
Ambassadors of Bangladesh to the United Arab Emirates
Chiefs of Army Staff, Bangladesh
Frontier Force Regiment officers
Pakistan Military Academy alumni
Bangladesh Army generals
People from Sylhet
Advisors of Caretaker Government of Bangladesh
Notre Dame College, Dhaka alumni